Purlear is an unincorporated community in Wilkes County, North Carolina, United States. Purlear has a post office with ZIP code 28665. Rendezvous Mountain State Park is located in Purlear.

Notable person
Johnson Jay Hayes, U.S. federal judge

References

Unincorporated communities in Wilkes County, North Carolina
Unincorporated communities in North Carolina